Xiangfeng wu were wind surveying instruments used to gather and measure the direction of the wind in ancient China.

History
Prior to the invention of Xiangfeng wu, the ancient Chinese used pieces of silk or cloth that was hung on a pole to measure wind direction. Epigraphic evidence attributing to the discovery of weather crow on a wall painting in a tomb dating to the Eastern Han dynasty in 1972. The Sanfu huangtu (三輔黃圖, Description of the Three Districts in the Capital), a 3rd-century book written by Miao Changyan about the palaces at Chang'an, describes a copper bird-shaped wind vane situated on a tower roof for the measurement of wind direction.

Xiangfeng wu composed of copper slices that were fixed on the top of a pole which could be revolved if the wind was blowing in a certain direction. Xiangfeng wu were first used in meteorological observatories and were later installed in government towers and private houses.

See also
Weather vane

References

Chinese inventions
Han dynasty
Measuring instruments
Meteorological instrumentation and equipment
Wind